In 2012, a strong storm swept across southern Uruguay from 18 to 19 September.

Facts
The main area affected were the departments on the River Plate and Atlantic coasts: Colonia, San José, Montevideo, Canelones, Maldonado, Rocha. 

The strongest winds were in Punta del Este (172 km/h), Montevideo (122 km/h), Laguna del Sauce (120 km/h), Colonia (103 km/h), San José (102 km/h), Melo (98 km/h), Tacuarembó (87 km/h), Rivera (83 km/h).

The government was forced to close public buildings, suspend transport and recommend residents in the capital Montevideo and other locations along the coast to remain at home. Luckily enough, it was the week of spring holidays, so children did not have to attend school.

Aftermath
Meteorologists considered this to be an extratropical cyclone.

General comment was that his cyclone was less severe than the 2005 storm.

Three people were reported dead in San José, due to a flood.

This storm is part of a regional phenomenon, called sudestada, covering also Argentina, Paraguay, and Bolivia, where other people were reported dead as well.

References

External links
 

Natural disasters in Uruguay
2012 in Uruguay
Climate of Uruguay
2012 meteorology
San José Department
Montevideo Department
Canelones Department
Maldonado Department
Rocha Department
Storms
2012 disasters in Uruguay